State Route 302 (SR 302) is a south-north state highway located in the southwestern part of the U.S. state of Georgia.

Route description
SR 302 begins at the Florida state line, where the roadway continues as State Road 267. It heads north, intersecting Bettstown Road and SR 302 Spur (Faceville Attapulgus Road) before reaching its northern terminus, an intersection with SR 97.

History

Major intersections

Related route

State Route 302 Spur (SR 302 Spur) is a  spur route that begins at an intersection with the SR 302 mainline, southeast of Faceville. It heads northwest until it meets its northern terminus, at an intersection with SR 97 in Faceville.

See also

References

External links

302
Transportation in Decatur County, Georgia